Marshall County is the name of twelve counties in the United States:

 Marshall County, Alabama 
 Marshall County, Illinois 
 Marshall County, Indiana 
 Marshall County, Iowa 
 Marshall County, Kansas 
 Marshall County, Kentucky 
 Marshall County, Minnesota 
 Marshall County, Mississippi 
 Marshall County, Oklahoma 
 Marshall County, South Dakota 
 Marshall County, Tennessee 
 Marshall County, West Virginia